Comfort is the brand name of a fabric softener sold by Unilever in the UK and around the world. The range includes Comfort Pure (for delicate skin)  and Comfort Crème (a premium brand). Scents include Passion Flower and Ylang Ylang, Lily and Riceflower, Wild Pear and Ginkgo and the Original Comfort Blue.

The product is sold as Soft in Chile, Badin in Israel and Molto in Indonesia and has similar variants to Comfort.

History 
Comfort was the first fabric softener to be launched in the UK in 1969. Today Comfort is a global brand, operating in Europe, Asia, Latin America and the Middle East.

1984 saw the launch of the first concentrated fabric softener for Comfort, which was three times more concentrated than regular fabric conditioner.

In the 1990s, the Comfort brand went through a number of changes: a new logo and more modern packaging in 1992 and the first fully  in 2022 it’s logo had another rebrand. biodegradable formulation in 1993. In 1998, Comfort replaced cartons with more environmentally-friendly and lightweight crushable bottles, introduced their first hypoallergenic fabric conditioner and launched tumble dryer sheets.

In 1997, Comfort was introduced in the Philippines as a fabric conditioner brand until it was discontinued in 2003. It was reintroduced in the Philippines in 2019.

In 2004, Comfort produced the first ever fabric softener capsules in the UK, Comfort Pearls. In 2005 Comfort launched a premium variant called Comfort Crème.

Scents and variants 
 Comfort Blue (Now Blue Skies)
 Comfort Silk
 Comfort Pure
 Comfort Ultra
 Comfort Garden Fresh
 Comfort Vitality
 Comfort Easy Iron
 Comfort Fast Dry
 Comfort Passion Flower & Ylang Ylang
 Comfort Lavender Bloom (South Africa)
 Comfort Lily & Rice Flower
 Comfort Wild Pear & Ginkgo
 Comfort Mango & Citrus (Limited Edition)
 Comfort Mandarin & Green Tea
 Comfort Creme Almond
 Comfort Creme Jojoba
 Comfort Sunshine (Now Sunshiny Days)
 Comfort Naturals Aloe Vera
 Comfort Naturals Olive Blossom
 Comfort Naturals Jojoba & Orchid
 Comfort Tropical
 Comfort Tempting Nature
 Comfort Rainforest
 Comfort Twilight Sensations Jasmine & Black Gardenia
 Comfort Twilight Sensations Vanilla
 Comfort Exhilarations Strawberry & Lily
 Comfort Exhilarations Blueberry & Jasmine
 Comfort Exhilarations Melon & Lotus Flower
 Comfort Exhilarations Bluebell & Bergamot
 Comfort Bright Whites
 Comfort Bright Colours
 Comfort Original was available in 1 and 2 litre sizes.
 Comfort Concentrate was originally available in 500ml; it is now available in 750ml, 1.5 litres, and 3 litres.
 Comfort Professional is available in 5 litre cartons.
 Comfort Forme 
 Comfort Vaporesse
 Comfort Creations
 Comfort Care Detergent (Philippines and Vietnam)
 Comfort Ultimate Care

Advertising: Clothworld 
Comfort’s current advertising features a world made of cloth, known as Clothworld. The campaign follows the adventures of the Clothworld people, who take care of themselves using different Comfort products.

The Clothworld campaign first appeared in 2000 and was created by Unilever and Ogilvy and Mather. The original Clothworld characters were teenage couple Lisa Weaver and Darren Denim, who were made by Aardman Animations, the creators of Wallace and Gromit.

Gradually, new members of Lisa's family (her mum Karen and sister Daisy) have been introduced, as well as other inhabitants of Clothworld, including Quinitin the beautician, Stitcher the school bully, Satina the soul diva and more recently, Dr Comfy.

The latest additions to Clothworld are Jeannie and Cardboard Man. The current television advertisement features Jeannie walking through a cloth French Riviera styled town. Her flexible jeans contrast with the stiffness of Cardboard Man.

The Clothworld campaign has travelled the world, running across Europe, Latin America, the Middle East and has recently launched in Asia. As the campaign has spread globally, the Clothworld characters are becoming popular in their own right with the Lisa and Darren character dolls selling on EBay as collectors' items. In Asia, the campaign is slightly different. Darren has been transformed into a popstar named Andy. The character Andy now has his own real world record and fan base.

Comfort has also grown a group of advocates for its Comfort Pure brand. They are known as the Comfort-eers and are an army of mothers who state that they believe Comfort Pure is the best choice for them and their babies.

Comfort has a number of partnerships with retail brands in the UK, including Mothercare on Comfort Pure and Debenhams. Comfort also sponsors the Prima Fashion Awards.

Comfort's tagline is 'Comfort makes a good clothes day'.

References

External links 
 Comfort UK website 

Cleaning product brands
Cleaning products
Unilever brands
Products introduced in 1969